Bellinghausen may refer to:

People with the surname
Axel Bellinghausen, German footballer
Eligius Franz Joseph, Freiherr von Munch-Bellinghausen, Austrian dramatist

Geography
Motu One (Society Islands)

See also
 Bellingshausen (disambiguation)